, sea oak is a species of kelp, of the brown algae, best known for its use in Japanese cuisine.

Description
Eisenia bicyclis is indigenous to temperate Pacific Ocean waters centered near Japan, although it is deliberately cultured elsewhere, including South Korea. It grows and reproduces seasonally. The fronds are shed and new ones formed annually. The plant appears both branched and feathered. It may be harvested by divers manually or mechanically, and the dried form is available year-round.

Cuisine
It is one of many species of seaweed used in Asian cuisine.

Usually purchased in a dried state, it is reconstituted quickly, taking about five minutes. Arame comes in dark brown strands, has a mild, semi-sweet flavor, and a firm texture. It is added to appetizers, casseroles, muffins, pilafs, soups, toasted dishes, and many other types of food. Its mild flavor makes it adaptable to many uses.

Chemistry 
Arame is high in calcium, iodine, iron, magnesium, and vitamin A as well as being a  dietary source of many other minerals. It also is harvested for alginate, fertilizer and iodide.  It contains the storage polysaccharide laminarin and the tripeptide eisenin, a peptide with immunological activity.

Lignan content in arame is noted by several sources. It also contains the phlorotannins phlorofucofuroeckol A, dioxinodehydroeckol, fucofuroeckol A, eckol, dieckol, triphloroethol A and 7-phloroethol. Extracts of this algae have been tested to combat MRSA staph infections.

See also 
 Edible seaweed
 Seafood allergy

References

Further reading 

 
 Kristina Turner. 1996. The Self-Healing Cookbook: A Macrobiotic Primer for the Healing Body. p. 122

Further reading
Iwata, Kayoko. Tagami, Keiko. Uchida, Shigeo. (16 July 2013). "Ecological Half-Lives of Radiocesium in 16 Species in Marine Biota after the TEPCO's Fukushima Daiichi Nuclear Power Plant Accident". Environmental Science and Technology. Vol. 47. Issue. 14. Web of Science Core Collection.

External links
AlgaeBase Profile, M.D. Guiry in Guiry, M.D. & Guiry, G.M. 2013. AlgaeBase. National University of Ireland, Galway, retrieved 8 February 2013.

Lessoniaceae
Edible seaweeds